Founded in 1988, Death Penalty Focus is a non-profit organization dedicated to the abolition of capital punishment through grassroots organizing, research, and the dissemination of information about the death penalty and its alternatives.

With over 100 000 supporters nationwide, Death Penalty Focus is governed by a volunteer Board of Directors composed of renowned political, religious, and civic leaders, along with legal scholars and attorneys involved in death penalty litigation. The President of Death Penalty Focus is actor and activist Mike Farrell. In addition, DPF has an Advisory Board composed of community and religious leaders, celebrities, writers, and representatives of labor and human rights organizations who support anti-death penalty work. DPF conducts research on behalf of lawyers, educators, and the general public, and sponsors a variety of public education and media campaigns. DPF also serves as a support network for its ten chapters throughout California and as a liaison among anti-death penalty groups nationwide. The organization played a leading role in organizing opposition protests to the execution of Stanley Tookie Williams and was described as "the strongest voice in California’s abolition movement" by San Francisco Magazine.

Mission
DPF believes that the death penalty is an ineffective and brutally simplistic response to the serious and complex problem of violent crime. By diverting attention and financial resources away from preventative measures that would actually increase personal safety, the death penalty causes more violence in society. DPF is convinced that when the public is informed about the inherent racism, injustice and the true human and financial cost associated with the death penalty, the United States will join the growing community of nations throughout the world who have already abolished capital punishment.

See also
 Helen Prejean, a leading U.S. anti-death penalty campaigner and DPF advisory board member
 Jeanne Woodford, Consultant for Death Penalty Focus
 James Lawson, Board Member, Death Penalty Focus
 Michael Millman, founder

External links 
 Death Penalty Focus
 Death Penalty Information Center Statistics and studies of deterrence and economic and racial bias
 California People of Faith Working Against the Death Penalty
 California Crime Victims for Alternatives to the Death Penalty

References

Organizations established in 1988
Anti–death penalty organizations in the United States